The Athletics Federation of Serbia is the governing body for the sport of athletics in Serbia.

Olympic Games

World Championships
included: IAAF: World outdoor championship, World indoor championship, World half marathon championship, World cross country championship, World race walking cup, IAU: 50km World Championship, 100km World Championship, 24 Hour World Championship

As of 20 Aug 2016

* team cross country medals

Continental Cup

European Championships
included: IAAF: European outdoor championship, European indoor championship, European cross country championship, European race walking cup, IAU: 100km European Championship, 24H European Championship

As of 5 Mar 2017

European Cup Winter Throwing
previously European Winter Throwing Challenge

as of 2017

European Team Championships

References

External links
 Official site

Serbia
Sports governing bodies in Serbia

National governing bodies for athletics
Sports organizations established in 2006